Todd Edward Johnson (born December 18, 1978) is an American former college and professional football player who was a safety in the National Football League (NFL) for seven seasons during the 2000s.  Johnson played college football for the University of Florida, and thereafter, he played professionally for the Chicago Bears, St. Louis Rams, and Buffalo Bills.

Early years 

Johnson was born in Sarasota, Florida in 1978.  He attended Riverview High School in Sarasota, where he was a standout defensive back for the Riverview Rams high school football team.  Johnson was an all-state selection and a SuperPrep All-American as a senior, and set the school record for the 110-yard intermediate hurdles in track & field.

College career 

Johnson accepted an athletic scholarship to attend the University of Florida in Gainesville, Florida, where he played for coach Steve Spurrier and coach Ron Zook's Florida Gators football teams from 1998 to 2002.  The Gators coaching staff decided to redshirt him as a true freshman in 1998, and he spent the season practicing with the scout team; subsequently, Johnson became a four-year letterman and started in thirty-three out of forty-nine games in which he played.  As a redshirt freshman in 1999, he had twenty-four tackles, four passes defensed, one forced fumble and one fumble recovery.  During his sophomore season in 2000, he started all thirteen games, led the team with a career-high 102 tackles, and had five interceptions, three passes defensed, one forced fumble, and four fumble recoveries, including one returned seventy-six yards for a touchdown, and received first-team All-Southeastern Conference (SEC) honors.  Johnson started all eleven games as junior in 2001, tallying seventy-two tackles, three passes defensed, and two interceptions and again received first-team All-SEC honors.  As a senior team captain in 2002, he started all thirteen games, and compiled eighty-eight tackles and two interceptions and was a second-team All-SEC selection.  Johnson finished his Gator career with a total of 284 tackles and nine interceptions.

Johnson graduated from the University of Florida with a bachelor's degree in applied physiology and kinesiology in 2009.

Professional career

Pre-draft

Chicago Bears 

He did not appear in any regular season games in 2003, after suffering a broken jaw in a preseason game. Johnson was Mike Brown's immediate backup during his time with the Bears, and saw extended playing time following Brown's season-ending injury in 2004. The following year, Johnson saw action in fourteen games, totaling thirty-five tackles. Johnson made thirty-two tackles during , and was released following the season.

St. Louis Rams 

Johnson signed a four-year $4 million contract to play with the St. Louis Rams on March 12, 2007. In his first season with the Rams, he finished the campaign with 29 tackles.  In 2008 Johnson made 23 tackles in a backup safety role.  He was waived by the Rams on September 5, 2009.

Buffalo Bills 

On October 13, 2009, Johnson signed a one-year free agent contract with the Buffalo Bills.  Johnson was placed on injured reserve on January 2, 2010 due to a hamstring injury.

Coaching career 

Johnson became the head football coach of his alma mater, Riverview High School, in 2011. He has also been a fill-in substitute teacher since 2012.

See also 

 Florida Gators football, 1990–99
 List of Buffalo Bills players
 List of Chicago Bears players
 List of Florida Gators in the NFL Draft
 List of St. Louis Rams players
 List of University of Florida alumni

References

Bibliography 

 Carlson, Norm, University of Florida Football Vault: The History of the Florida Gators, Whitman Publishing, LLC, Atlanta, Georgia (2007).  .
 Golenbock, Peter, Go Gators!  An Oral History of Florida's Pursuit of Gridiron Glory, Legends Publishing, LLC, St. Petersburg, Florida (2002).  .
 Hairston, Jack, Tales from the Gator Swamp: A Collection of the Greatest Gator Stories Ever Told, Sports Publishing, LLC, Champaign, Illinois (2002).  .

1978 births
Living people
American football safeties
Buffalo Bills players
Chicago Bears players
Florida Gators football players
Sportspeople from Sarasota, Florida
St. Louis Rams players
Riverview High School (Sarasota, Florida) alumni